Sporting Club Ell is a football club, based in Ell, Luxembourg. The women's football team has won the national championship Dames Ligue 1 in 2013/14 and a national cup in 2012. The men's team plays in lower divisions.

History
The women's team was founded in 2005. In 2009/10 they won promotion to the national top league. They then reached the 2012 cup final against favorites Progrés Niederkorn which they won in a penalty shootout. In 2013/14 the team won the championship.

References

External links
Official website
soccerway.com profile

Women's football clubs in Luxembourg
Football clubs in Luxembourg